Helicopter Maritime Strike Squadron Five Zero (HSM-50) "VALKYRIES" is a United States Navy helicopter squadron based at Adm David L. McDonald Field, Naval Station Mayport, Mayport, Florida, United States. The squadron will be under the control of Helicopter Maritime Strike Wing Atlantic.

The squadron performs a diverse set of multi-role missions:

Primary missions include:
Anti-submarine warfare (ASW)
Anti-surface warfare (ASU)

Secondary missions include:
Search and rescue (SAR)
Medical evacuation (MEDEVAC)
Vertical replenishment (VERTREP)
Special operations support (SPECOPS)
Naval Surface Fire Support (NSFS)
Communications Relay (COMREL)
Logistics support

References

See also
 History of the United States Navy
 List of United States Navy aircraft squadrons

Helicopter maritime strike squadrons of the United States Navy